Andrés Xiloj Peruch was a Kʼicheʼ daykeeper (Kʼicheʼ: ajq'ij) from Momostenango in Guatemala. He was also one of the four "chuchkajawib" (lineage leaders) of Momostenango. After his death, his son Angél became chuchkajaw of the Santa Isabel lineage. Being a native speaker of the Kʼicheʼ language and a practitioner of traditional Maya calendric divination, he served as a consultant for several anthropological studies. He assisted Dennis Tedlock in elaborating his award-winning translation of the ancient Kʼicheʼ document Popol Vuh. Dennis Tedlock has described the translation process as "three-way dialogue among Andres Xiloj, the Popol Vuh text, and myself."

Notes

External links
 Transcript of filmed interview with Andrés Xiloj, from the film Breaking the Maya Code, released March 2008 by Night Fire Films

Guatemalan Maya people
People from Totonicapán Department
K'iche'
Year of birth missing
Year of death missing